HD 33519, also known as HR 1682, is a probable spectroscopic binary located in the southern circumpolar constellation Mensa. It is one of the stars near the limit of naked eye visibility, having an apparent magnitude of 6.28. However, this value is poorly constrained.

The visible component has a stellar classification of K5/M0 III, indicating an evolved red giant with the characteristics of a K5 and M0 giant star. At present it has 4.34 times the mass of the Sun but has expanded to 45.4 times its girth. HD 33519's metallicity, what astronomers dub as elements heavier than helium, is around solar level.

It has no relation to the system, having a drastically different proper motion.

References

K-type giants
M-type giants
Mensa (constellation)
Spectroscopic binaries
Double stars
033519
023251
1682
CD-78 00190
Mensae, 19